Luke Nicholson is a Canadian pop folk singer and songwriter.

Background
Nicholson was born and raised in Lakefield, Ontario. He is the brother of singer-songwriter Royal Wood. Both brothers have similar classic pop styles, and regularly contribute as supporting musicians on each other's albums. Nicholson's music is primarily guitar-based, however, while Wood is better known as a pianist.

Career
Nicholson began his career as a regular house performer at The Cameron House in Toronto. He first attracted wider attention when "Breathe", a song he wrote for the soundtrack to the film Poor Boy's Game, received a Genie Award nomination for Best Original Song at the 28th Genie Awards in 2008.

He subsequently recorded two limited-release independent demo albums, before issuing his first major label record, Mad Love, on MapleMusic Recordings in 2012. Four singles from the album gained significant airplay on CBC Radio 2, with all charting on The Radio 2 Top 20.

Nicholson followed up with Frantic City in 2015, again receiving radio airplay, with the singles "Sadie" and "Maggie's Song".

His newest album, Shape and Sound, was released in April 2017.

Nicholson has toured widely across Canada to support his music, as well as performing festival dates in France and Germany.

Discography
 Mad Love (2012)
 Frantic City (2015)
 Shape and Sound (2017)

References

External links
 

Canadian pop singers
Canadian male singers
Canadian singer-songwriters
Musicians from Toronto
People from Peterborough County
Living people
Canadian indie pop musicians
MapleMusic Recordings artists
Canadian pop guitarists
Canadian male guitarists
Year of birth missing (living people)
Canadian male singer-songwriters